Cecil George "Nugget" Jesson (7 July 1899 – 25 December 1961) was a member of the Queensland Legislative Assembly.

Biography
Jesson was born in Sydney, New South Wales, the son of George Jesson and his wife Lillian Maude (née Jones). He married Dorothy J Harris in 1922 and they had one son. He then married Wilhelmina Mary Graham in 1928 and they had one son and four daughters.

He died in Brisbane on Christmas Day and was buried in the Toowong Cemetery.

Public career
Jesson held the seat of Kennedy for the Labor Party in the Queensland Legislative Assembly from 1935 until 1950. He then held the new seat of Hinchinbrook from 1950 to 1960.

He was the government from 1950 until 1957 and opposition whip from 1957 to 1960.

References

Members of the Queensland Legislative Assembly
1899 births
1961 deaths
Burials at Toowong Cemetery
Australian Labor Party members of the Parliament of Queensland
20th-century Australian politicians